Henrique de Jesus Bernardo (born 19 January 1987), commonly known as Henrique, is a Brazilian professional footballer who plays as a forward. He was member of the Corinthians team that won the Copa do Brasil in 2009.

External links

Henrique at playmakerstats.com (English version of ogol.com.br)

1987 births
Living people
Brazilian footballers
Association football forwards
Guarani FC players
Sport Club Corinthians Paulista players
Vitória F.C. players
Aluminium Hormozgan F.C. players
Esporte Clube São José players
ASC Oțelul Galați players
FC Viitorul Constanța players
Primeira Liga players
Liga I players
Brazilian expatriate footballers
Expatriate footballers in Portugal
Expatriate footballers in Iran
Expatriate footballers in Romania
Brazilian expatriate sportspeople in Portugal
Brazilian expatriate sportspeople in Iran
Brazilian expatriate sportspeople in Romania
Sportspeople from Campinas